Bevan Duncan Smith (born 18 July 1950) is a former New Zealand sprinter. He won the bronze medal in the men's 200 metres at the 1974 British Commonwealth Games.

He represented New Zealand at the 1972 Summer Olympics, placing 4th in his heat of the 2nd round of the 200 metres.

At the 1974 British Commonwealth Games he came 4th in the 400 metres, and was part of the men's 4 × 100 m and 4 × 400 m relay teams that placed 7th and 5th respectively. Smith competed at his second Commonwealth Games in 1978 where he made the quarter finals of the 200 metres and ran in the 4 x 100 and 4 x 400 relay teams again.

References

1950 births
New Zealand male sprinters
Athletes (track and field) at the 1972 Summer Olympics
Olympic athletes of New Zealand
Commonwealth Games bronze medallists for New Zealand
Commonwealth Games medallists in athletics
Athletes (track and field) at the 1974 British Commonwealth Games
Athletes (track and field) at the 1978 Commonwealth Games
Living people
Medallists at the 1974 British Commonwealth Games